The Houma Conquerors were a professional indoor football team and a charter member of the Southern Indoor Football League (SIFL).  Based in Houma, Louisiana, the Conquerors played their home games at the Houma Terrebonne Civic Center.  This was Houma's second attempt at an indoor football team following the National Indoor Football League's Houma Bayou Bucks.  The Bucks also played their games at the Houma Civic Center from 2002 to 2004.

They began play in the SIFL's inaugural 2009 season and lost their first five games, all but one by double digits.  Despite a poor 1–7 start and numerous off-the-field distractions, the Conquerors finished with two wins in their last three games, earning the team a spot in the SIFL playoffs. In January 2010, the team announced they would suspend play for the 2010 season, but potentially return for the 2011 season.

Season-by-season

References

American football teams in Louisiana
Southern Indoor Football League teams
Conquerors
American football teams established in 2008
American football teams disestablished in 2010
2008 establishments in Louisiana
2010 disestablishments in Louisiana